St George's School or Saint George's School may refer to:

Brunei 
 St. George's School, Brunei

Canada
 St. George's School of Montreal, Quebec
 St. George's School (Vancouver), British Columbia

Germany
 St. George's The British International School

India
 St. George's Grammar School (Hyderabad)
 St. George's School, Chennai
 St George's College, Mussoorie, Uttarakhand

Israel and Palestine
 St. George's College, Jerusalem
 St. George's School, Jerusalem

Italy 
 St. George's British International School, Rome

Malaysia 
 St. George's Girls' School, George Town, Penang
 St. George's Institution, Taiping

South Africa
 St. George's Grammar School (Cape Town)

Spain 
 St. George's British School, Sevilla, Seville

Switzerland
 St George's School in Switzerland

Turkey
 St. George's Austrian High School, Istanbul

United Kingdom

England
 St George's Catholic School,  Maida Vale, London
 St George's School, Windsor Castle, Berkshire
 St George's School, Ascot, Berkshire
 St George's School, Harpenden (St.George's V.A School), Hertfordshire
 St George's School, Stowmarket; renamed to Finborough School
 St. George of England Specialist Engineering College (formerly St. George of England High School), Bootle, Merseyside
 St George's Church of England School, Gravesend, Kent
 St George's Church of England Foundation School, Broadstairs, Kent
 St George's School, Blackpool, Lancashire
 St George's College, Weybridge, Surrey
 St George's School, Birmingham, West Midlands

Scotland
 St. George's School, Edinburgh

United States
 St. George's School, Tinley Park, Illinois
 St. George School, Baton Rouge, Louisiana; see 
 St. George's School (Rhode Island),  Middletown, Rhode Island
 St. George's Independent School, Memphis, Germantown, and Collierville, Tennessee
 Saint George's School (Spokane, Washington)

Zimbabwe
 St. George's College, Harare

See also
 St George's Academy
 St. George's College (disambiguation)